Karl Norbert Schmid (16 December 1926 – 13 February 1995) was a German organist, composer, choir director and music educator.

Life and career 
Schmid was born in Ochsenhausen. This influenced his career decision: After the Abitur, he studied Catholic church music at the Kirchenmusikschule (today ) in Regensburg from 1943 to 1948, making him one of the first graduates after World War II. He then studied until 1952 at the Musikhochschule Stuttgart with Anton Nowakowski (organ), Karl Marx (composition), Hermann Keller (music theory), Gustav Koslik (orchestra conducting) and Hans Grischkat (choral conducting).

In 1954, Ferdinand Haberl brought him to the Regensburg Kirchenmusikschule as lecturer for organ playing and choir direction, and also entrusted him with the direction of the school's choir. He formed a choir with a specific sound, which became the school's flagship (Aushängeschild). It became known through concert tours, radio and recordings. In 1985, Schmid had to give it up for health reasons, but he continued to work as a lecturer. He worked in Regensburg as composer and teacher for more than thirty years.

In 1972, Schmid was awarded the Silver Pontifical Medal from Pope Paul VI in Rome for the achievements of the Kirchenmusischulchor. In 1975, he was awarded the culture prize of Eastern Bavaria, and in 1977 he was appointed Episcopal Kirchenmusikdirektor. He became a member of the church music commission of the Diocese of Regensburg in 1984.

Schmid was married twice, to Elisabeth née Hebele, and later to Hildegard née Hauser. Both wives died of illness, and had no children. Schmid died after a short illness at the age of 68 and was buried on 16 February 1995 in a family grave at the Lower Catholic Cemetery in Regensburg.

Work 
After the Second Vatican Council, the vernacular language was also used in the liturgy instead of the historic Latin. Schmid filled the shortage in suitable church music in German by composing settings of hymns from the Gotteslob, often with Überchor (a choir in higher range than congregational singing), chorale cantatas, psalms settings, masses and proprium hymns. His works are accessible to lay performers. They became widely used throughout German-speaking countries.

Schmid dedicated his Te Deum for soloists, choir and orchestra, Op. 100, to Bishop Manfred Müller. He is known for his setting with Überchor of "Großer Gott, wir loben dich", which is often performed at the end of festive masses, sometimes augmented with brass or orchestra. It ended an open-air Papal mass in Regensburg when Pope Benedict XVI , leading to more popularity.

Schmid's compositional estate is held by Proskesche Musikabteilung der Bischöflichen Zentralbibliothek (Proske's music department of the episcopal central library) in Regensburg.

References

External links 
 Schmid, Karl Norbert on BMLO
 
 
 
 Karl Norbert Schmid Carus-Verlag

20th-century hymnwriters
German classical organists
German choral conductors
1926 births
1995 deaths
People from Ochsenhausen